Donald Eugene Kroodsma (born 7 July 1946 in Zeeland, Michigan) is an American author and ornithologist, one of the world's leading experts on the science of birdsong.

Education and career
He received in 1968 his B.A. from Hope College in Holland, Michigan and in 1972 his Ph.D. from Oregon State University under John A. Wiens with dissertation Singing behavior of the Bewick's wren: development, dialects, population structure, and geographical variation. Kroodsma was from 1972 to 1974 a postdoc and from 1974 to 1980 an assistant professor at Rockefeller University. He was from 1980 to 1987 an associate professor and from 1987 to 2003 a full professor and is since 2004 a professor emeritus at the University of Massachusetts, Amherst.

His research deals with vocal behavior in birds, including neural control, evolution, ontogeny, and ecology. He was an associate editor from 1996 to 2003 for the encyclopedia Birds of North America and from 1998 to 2002 for the journal The Auk.

Awards and honors
2003 — Elliott Coues Award from the American Ornithologists’ Union
2006 — John Burroughs Medal for natural history writing, for The Singing Life of Birds
2006 — Robert Ridgway Award from the American Birding Association "given for excellence in publications pertaining to field ornithology"
2014 — Margaret Morse Nice Medal from the Wilson Ornithological Society

Selected publications

Articles

with Roberta Pickert: 
with Richard A. Canady and Fernando Nottebohm: 

with Bruce E. Byers: 
with Masakazu Konishi:

Books
as editor with Edward H. Miller:  
as editor with E. H. Miller: 
as editor with E. H. Miller:

References

External links

 (lecture by Donald Kroodsma, May 6, 2011, Cary Institute of Ecosystem Studies)

American ornithologists
Hope College alumni
Oregon State University alumni
University of Massachusetts Amherst faculty
1946 births
Living people